Trans-2,3-enoyl-CoA reductase is an enzyme that in humans is encoded by the TECR gene.

This gene encodes a multi-pass membrane protein that resides in the endoplasmic reticulum, and belongs to the steroid 5-alpha reductase family. The elongation of microsomal long and very long chain fatty acid consists of 4 sequential reactions. This protein catalyzes the final step, reducing trans-2,3-enoyl-CoA to saturated acyl-CoA. Alternatively spliced transcript variants have been found for this gene.

Clinical relevance
Mutations in this gene have been shown to cause non-syndromic mental retardation.

References

Further reading 
 

EC 1.3.1